Kishacoquillas may refer to:

In Pennsylvania:
Kishacoquillas, Pennsylvania, an unincorporated community
Kishacoquillas Creek, a tributary of the Juniata River
Kishacoquillas Valley, located in Mifflin and Huntingdon Counties